Oleg Fediukov (born October 20, 1972) is an American former competitive ice dancer. With Debbie Koegel, he is the 1998 Nebelhorn Trophy silver medalist and a two-time (1999–2000) U.S. national bronze medalist.

Personal life 
Fediukov was born on October 20, 1972 in Moscow. He moved to the United States on September 2, 1992. He became a U.S. citizen on January 19, 2000. He and Debbie Koegel are married and have three sons – Anton, born on October 20, 2002; Alec, born  2004; and Luka Sergei, born on September 23, 2008.

Career

Early career 
Competing with Ekaterina Proskurina for the Soviet Union, Fediukov won the silver medal at the 1991 Grand Prix International St. Gervais. After moving to the United States, he skated one season with Julieanna Sacchetti, with whom he won the novice bronze medal at the 1993 U.S. Championships. He then competed for three seasons with Laura Gayton. Gayton/Fediukov won the 1994 U.S. national junior title and moved up to the senior level the following season. They placed eighth at the 1996 U.S. Championships.

Partnership with Koegel 
Fediukov teamed up with Debbie Koegel in 1996. They finished sixth at the 1997 U.S. Championships. Koegel/Fediukov withdrew from the 1997 Karl Schäfer Memorial after the compulsory dances; a Swiss skater sliced Koegel's left biceps in a practice accident on October 16, 1997. The duo returned to the ice in December, training at the New England Figure Skating Club in Marlboro, Massachusetts. A month later, they placed sixth at the 1998 U.S. Championships.

After winning the silver medal at the 1998 Nebelhorn Trophy, Koegel/Fediukov debuted on the Grand Prix series, placing 8th at the 1998 Skate Canada International and tenth at the 1998 Trophée Lalique. They were awarded the bronze medal at the 1999 U.S. Championships. They were coached by Uschi Keszler and Robbie Kane at Ice Works FSC in Aston, Pennsylvania. 

The following season, Koegel/Fediukov again received two Grand Prix invitations; they placed sixth at the 1999 Skate Canada International but had to withdraw from the 1999 Cup of Russia due to a visa problem. The duo repeated as national bronze medalists at the 2000 U.S. Championships. They withdrew from the 2001 U.S. Championships due to a knee injury that Fediukov incurred in the compulsory dance. After Koegel sustained a shoulder injury, the two decided to retire from competition.

Programs 
(with Koegel)

Competitive highlights
GP: Grand Prix

With Proskurina for the Soviet Union

For the United States

With Sacchetti

With Gayton

With Koegel

References

1972 births
American male ice dancers
Soviet male ice dancers
Living people
People with acquired American citizenship
Russian emigrants to the United States
Figure skaters from Moscow